The Grande Lui (3,509 m) is a mountain of the Mont Blanc massif, located west of La Fouly in the canton of Valais. It lies east of the Aiguille de l'A Neuve, on the range between the glaciers of Saleina and L'A Neuve.

References

External links
 Grande Lui on Hikr

Mountains of the Alps
Alpine three-thousanders
Mountains of Valais
Mountains of Switzerland
Mont Blanc massif